Polygonia progne, the gray comma or grey comma, is a species of Polygonia that occurs in North America.

Description

Its wingspan is between 4.4 and 6.3 cm. The top of the wings is bright orange brown while the summer forms often have a dark border on the hindwing. Both winter and summer forms have few yellow spots on their wing borders. The underside of the wings have L-shaped silver markings and are charcoal gray.

Habitat
They can often be found around dirt roads and stream beds. Most often they are found in hilly terrain or canyon lands.

Life cycle
The adults are on wing two times a year, once in April and May and another in June and August. During the first flight the adults mate and lay eggs. These eggs will hatch and become the summer generation. The summer generation's eggs will hatch in October and hibernate.

Larval foods

 Gooseberry
 Azalea

Adult foods

 Plant sap
 Rarely flower nectar

References

External links

Grey comma, Butterflies of Canada

Butterflies of North America
Nymphalini
Taxa named by Pieter Cramer
Butterflies described in 1775